Saddle Lake Cree Nation is a Plains Cree, First Nations community, located in the Amiskwacīwiyiniwak ("Beaver Hills") region of central Alberta, Canada. The Nation is a signatory to Treaty 6, and their traditional language is Plains Cree.

Saddle Lake's governing structure is unusual in that it has two separate councils and chiefs governing their two reserves - Saddle Lake Cree Nation (proper) and the Whitefish Lake First Nation (often called "Whitefish (Goodfish) Lake First Nation" to distinguish it from a similarly named group in Manitoba). For the purposes of the Indian Act however, Saddle Lake and Whitefish have one, shared, band government and the two reserves are considered to be one Nation.

In June 2013, the Nation reported a population of 9,934 people, of which 6,148 people lived on their own Reserve. Their reported population size makes Saddle Lake the second most populous First Nation in Alberta (after the Kainai Nation also known as the Blood people). Of these 2,378 were members of the Whitefish Lake First Nation, with 1,778 of those living on-reserve, and remainder are members of the Saddle Lake Cree Nation proper.

History

Pre-contact to treaty 
In 1876, the Amiskwacīwiyiniwak, who were a loose confederation of Cree and Assiniboine band societies (part of the wider Iron Confederation), entered into a treaty relationship with Canada through Treaty 6. Chief Onchaminahos ("Little Hunter"), representing the Saddle Lake Band of Cree, and Chief Pakân ("Nut"), representing Whitefish Lake Band of Cree together represented the people of the Saddle Lake Cree Nation at the negotiations and signing at Fort Pitt (now in Saskatchewan). When the government did not agree to this, Pakan's and Big Bear's bands refused to settle on reserves until better term were offered; Pakan went to Regina with the Métis translator Peter Erasmus in 1884 to discuss the matter with the Indian commissioner.

Amalgamation of bands 
In 1902, four historical Cree bands were amalgamated as the Saddle Lake Cree Nation. The four Cree Bands were:
 Onchaminahos' Band, led by Chief Onchaminahos ("Little Hunter"; also known as Thomas Hunter);
 Seenum's Band, led by Chief Pakân ("Nut", also known as James Seenum);
 Blue Quill's Band, led by Chief Blue Quill; and
 Wasatnow's Band, led by Chief Muskegwatic ("Bear Ears").
However, the amalgamation process wasn't fully completed until 1953 when the treaty pay lists of the Little Hunter's, James Seenum's and Blue Quill's Bands were merged.

Election reforms 
Before 1985, First Nations women who married non-indigenous men automatically lost their Status as "Registered Indians" under the Indian Act.  After the passage of Bill C-31 in 1985, women no longer lost status for "marrying out" but the Saddle Lake and Whitefish Lake councils continued to prevent such women from voting in band council elections. This was challenged in two court cases in 2022.  The Federal Court (Canada) ruled against the Whitefish Lake council and in favour of women who had brought suit against the council in February 2023.  The case against the Saddle Lake council was still being heard .

Reserves
There are three reserves under the governance of the Saddle Lake Cree Nation, one of which is shared with five other bands:
  Blue Quills, formerly known as the "Blue Quill Indian Reserve 127", shared with five other bands (see article)
  Saddle Lake 125, containing the community of Saddle Lake, Alberta
  Whitefish Lake 128; the reserve is also known as "Whitefish Lake Indian Reserve 128" or as "Goodfish Lake Indian Reserve 128", and occasionally as "Whitefish (Goodfish) Lake Indian Reserve 128"

Originally, Chief Muskegwatic had also reserved Washatanow (or Hollow Hill Creek) Indian Reserve 126  along the north bank of the North Saskatchewan River. However, this Reserve was surrendered in 1896 in exchange for an equal area of land adjoining Saddle Lake Indian Reserve 125, known today as the "Cache Lake Addition" of the Saddle Lake Indian Reserve 125. Blue Quill Indian Reserve 127 was originally reserved for the use by the Blue Quill's Band, but in 1896, a boarding school (Sacred Heart Indian Residential School, commonly called the "Saddle Lake Boarding School") was relocated from Lac la Biche, Alberta, to the Blue Quill Indian Reserve, and the Band relocated to the Saddle Lake Indian Reserve. In 1931, Blue Quill Indian Reserve 127 became a shared Reserve when the boarding school relocated to St. Paul, Alberta.

Saddle Lake Indian Reserve 125 is bordered by Smoky Lake County, the County of St. Paul No. 19, and County of Two Hills No. 21.

Governance
Saddle Lake Cree Nation elect their officials through a Custom Electoral System. Additionally, this Cree Nation maintains two groups of elected officials:

Saddle Lake Cree Nation
Saddle Lake Cree Nation on the Saddle Lake Indian Reserve have elected Chief Eric Shirt, and Councillors John Large, Eddy Makokis, Leonard Jackson, Glen Jason Whiskeyjack, James Steinhauer, Pamela Quinn, Cherrilene Steinhauer, Darcy McGilvery.

Whitefish Lake First Nation
Saddle Lake Cree Nation on the White Fish Lake Indian Reserve, governing the Reserve as the Whitefish Lake First Nation, also have elected officials. The Whitefish Lake First Nation have elected Chief Tom Houle, and Councillors Stan Houle, Greg Sparklingeyes, and Kevin Halfe.

Notable people

James Makokis, doctor, specialist in traditional medicine, transgender and Indigenous healthcare.
 Doreen Spence, nurse, human rights activist.
 Northern Cree, powwow and round dance drum group.
Lana Whiskeyjack, ipkDoc, professor, women and gender activist, and artist.
Gwen Bridge, environmental scientist and conservation advocate.
Ralph Steinhauer tenth lieutenant governor of Alberta

References

External links
 Official site of the Saddle Lake Cree Nation
 Official site of the Whitefish Lake First Nation
 Aboriginal Affairs and Northern Development Canada's profile of Saddle Lake Cree Nation
Profile of White Fish Lake 128 from Northeast Alberta Information HUB Alliance

First Nations governments in Alberta
Cree governments